Hardin is an unincorporated community in Shelby County, in the U.S. state of Ohio.

History
Hardin was platted in 1816. The community was named for John Hardin (1753–1792), a Continental Army officer in the American Revolutionary War. Hardin was the county seat from 1819 until 1820. A post office called Hardin was established in 1820, and discontinued in 1909.

References

Unincorporated communities in Shelby County, Ohio
Unincorporated communities in Ohio